The 2015–16 North Caledonian Football League will be competed for by six clubs playing ten matches each.  Golspie Sutherland were the defending champions.  Invergordon returned to the league following a two-year absence.  Sutherland United withdrew from the league prior to the start of the season.

Teams

League table

References

North Caledonian Football League seasons

5